This is a list of events from British radio in 1936.

Events
20 March – The Lisnagarvey transmitting station begins service, broadcasting the BBC Regional Programme for Northern Ireland on a frequency of 977 kHz.
1 August – Lieutenant commander Thomas Woodrooffe commentates for the BBC at the opening ceremony of the 1936 Summer Olympics in Berlin.
12 October – The Burghead transmitting station begins service, broadcasting the Scottish BBC Regional Programme to the north of Scotland on a frequency of 767 kHz.
11 December – In a worldwide radio broadcast, King Edward VIII of the United Kingdom makes a speech from Windsor Castle explaining the reasons for his abdication of the throne, introduced by John Reith in person.
Construction begins on the BBC's Broadcasting House, Belfast.

Births
2 March – John Tusa, Czech-born broadcast presenter and administrator
30 March – John Tydeman, radio drama producer (died 2020)
12 May – Peter Goodwright, comedic impressionist (died 2020)
16 May – Roy Hudd, comedy performer (died 2020)
1 August – Laurie Taylor, sociologist and radio presenter
20 November – Bill Wallis, character actor (died 2013)
12 December – Denise Coffey, actress (died 2022)

References 

 
Years in British radio
Radio